Ernesto Javier Gómez Barrales (born 7 November 1978) is a Mexican politician from the National Action Party. In 2009 he served as Deputy of the LX Legislature of the Mexican Congress representing Puebla.

References

1978 births
Living people
Politicians from Puebla
National Action Party (Mexico) politicians
21st-century Mexican politicians
Deputies of the LX Legislature of Mexico
Members of the Chamber of Deputies (Mexico) for Puebla